St Mary's is an Anglican church in Hadleigh, Suffolk. It is an active parish church in the Diocese of St Edmundsbury and Ipswich and the archdeaconry of Ipswich. Its earliest parts date from medieval times, the church is a Grade I listed building.

History and architecture
The church has a late 13th-century or early 14th-century tower and 14th-century aisles. The church was almost wholly reworked in the 15th century, when the arcades were rebuilt, and the clerestory, south porch and northeast vestry added. At this time also the whole building, except for the tower, was re-fenestrated. In the 19th century and early 20th century the church was extensively restored.

The church is constructed of flint rubble with stone dressings and has leaded roofs and spire. It has an aisled nave and chancel, a western tower, a two-storey south porch and a north vestry. On 26 April 1950 the church was designated a Grade I listed building. Its listing by Historic England records the principal reasons for designation as its size, the quality of its late-medieval architecture and its interior.

References

Bibliography
 Tricker, Roy, (2011), St Mary’s Church Hadleigh- Its History and Treasures, Official Church Guidebook
 Mortlock, D. M, (2009), The Guide to Suffolk Churches, pp. 217–21
 Pevsner, N and Radcliffe, E. (1974), Buildings of England: Suffolk, pp. 243–44

External links

 Church website
 Timeline at Church website

Church of England church buildings in Suffolk
Grade I listed churches in Suffolk
St Mary